Jocelyne Villeton (born September 17, 1954, in Vals-les-Bains, Ardèche) is a retired long-distance runner from France, who won the bronze medal in the marathon at the 1987 World Championships in Rome, Italy.

Jocelyne Villeton only occasionally practiced athletics in her teens in the 1970s.

Finding herself unemployed in the early 1980s, she decided to devote herself to distance running, driven by her husband. By 1984, she was French champion in the 10,000 meters and 25 kilometers on the road. In subsequent years, she gained new titles and performed strongly in the marathon.

In 1987, when she had to find employment in the municipality of Saint-Étienne, she surprised everyone by winning the very first French medal at the IAAF World Championships in Athletics with a third place in the marathon. Until 1991, she ran at the highest European level.

She now lives in Saint-Genest-Lerpt, and continues to run as a veteran. She is a Knight of the National Order of Merit in 2002 and a Knight of the Legion of Honour in 2008.

French Championships 
 1984 :  French Champion at 10 000 metres 
 1984 :  French Champion at 25 kilometres on road
 1985 :  French Championships at 10 000 metres
 1986 :  French Champion at 10 000 metres, with new French record
 1987 :  French Champion at 10 000 metres
 1988 :  French Championships at 10 000 metres
 1991 :  French Champion at 25 kilometres on road
 1991 :  French Champion at 10 000 metres
 1995 : 5th at French Championships of the half-marathon

International Performances 

 1984 : 25th at World Road Race 10 kilometres Championship
 1985 : Selected to World Cross Country Championship
 1985 : World Champion at 15 kilometres on road for 1985
 1986 : 5th at 1986 European Marathon Championship
 1987 :  1987 World Championships for the marathon
 1988 : 10th at World Championships for 15 kilometres on road
 1988 : 19th at marathon of 1988 Olympic Games
 1992 : selected to the World Championships for the semi-marathon
 1984-1995 : 25 selections for French international teams

References 
 
 
 
  Personal website
  sports-reference

1954 births
Living people
Sportspeople from Ardèche
French female long-distance runners
Athletes (track and field) at the 1988 Summer Olympics
Olympic athletes of France
Place of birth missing (living people)
World Athletics Championships medalists
World Athletics Championships athletes for France
Knights of the Ordre national du Mérite
French female marathon runners